Keep Your Powder Dry is a 1945 American drama film directed by Edward Buzzell and starring Lana Turner, Susan Peters, and Laraine Day. Its plot follows three women who join the Women's Army Corps during World War II. The screenplay was written by George Bruce and Mary C. McCall, Jr.

Filmed in Florida and Iowa in late 1944, Keep Your Powder Dry premiered in Washington, D.C. on March 6, 1945. It went on to become a financial success for its studio, Metro-Goldwyn-Mayer, earning $2.7 million against its $1.3 million budget.

Plot
Socialite Valerie "Val" Parks is informed that she is not eligible to claim her trust fund until she can demonstrate responsibility. In response, she decides to join the Women's Army Corps (WAC) to show she is a mature young woman. En route to the training camp in Des Moines, Iowa, she meets Ann Darrison, a housewife who chose to enlist in the WAC after her husband is deployed overseas; and Leigh Rand, the daughter of a military family. Val and Leigh, assigned to the same barracks, immediately clash, with Leigh acting bossily toward the servile Val.

Ann attempts to remediate the tensions between Val and Leigh. During training, Val challenges Leigh's assumptions about her by working intensely and excelling in her courses. Upon completing basic training, Val, Ann, and Leigh are assigned to a Motor Transport school within the WAC. Val and Leigh eventually warm to each other, and together attempt to help the self-conscious Ann boost her confidence. Ultimately, all three women are accepted into the Officer's Candidate School. Bill Barclay, a peer of Ann's husband, visits the base and has Ann record herself speaking on a disc so he can bring it back to her husband overseas. At the base, Bill becomes enamored of Val, which results in jealousy from Leigh, who also finds Bill attractive. Leigh thwarts a potential date between the two by arranging Val to be assigned to duty, which angers Val.

Some time later, Val receives a telegram from her attorney inviting her to meet him at a hotel, but upon arriving finds her friend Harriet, and a drunken Junior Vanderhausen, both people from her socialite circle. Harriet, who is living on Val's income, convinces Val to sign a lease for a home in Palm Beach, Florida. Angered by the two's dismissive attitude toward her endeavors in the WAC, Val criticizes them before Junior spills his drink on her uniform. Afraid of returning to the barracks reeking of alcohol, Val asks Leigh, who is also staying in the hotel on a weekend pass, to return to the barracks and occupy her bed so she is not absent from nightly inspection. Leigh agrees, and returns to the hotel in the morning to bring Val a clean uniform. In the hotel elevator, Leigh encounters Junior, who tells her Val only joined the military to claim her inheritance.

Disgusted by what she perceives as Val's insincerity, Leigh embarks on a smear campaign against Val after she is appointed platoon commander. Two days prior to the graduation, Val finally stands up to Leigh, slapping her in the face. The women's commanding officer, Lt. Colonel Spottiswoode, subsequently informs Leigh that half of the platoon has ranked her unfit to fulfill her leadership position as she lacks empathy. Shortly after, Spottiswoode reluctantly informs Ann that her husband has been killed in combat. Ann and Leigh console one another, and Leigh admits to Ann that she has always been jealous of Val's beauty and commitment. Ann and Leigh visit Val at the hotel, and they reconcile.

Leigh and Val implore Spottiswoode for permission to remain in the WAC as enlistees despite their recent transgressions. Convinced that both women are truly remorseful, Spottiswoode relents and allows them to graduate from the Officer's Candidate School alongside Ann.

Cast

Analysis
Film scholar Yvonne Tasker notes that, while many war films of the mid-20th century are concerned with demonstrating women's capability in the military, Keep Your Powder Dry instead is "more preoccupied with picturing women's service as not only respectable but healthy and moral. Thus the film condenses its acknowledgment of skeptical men to a single sequence in which the recruits fix an incredulous general's new car."

Production
Principal photography began August 28, 1944, and completed in November 1944. It was reported in August 1944 that cinematographer Richard Rosson shot backgrounds for the film at the Women's Army Corps training centers in Des Moines, Iowa and Fort Oglethorpe. Sgt. Art Moore of the U.S. Army Signal Corps Photographic Unit instructed 50 dancing girls for drill scenes featured in the film.

Release

Box office
The film premiered in Washington, D.C. on March 6, 1945. It subsequently premiered in New York City on March 10, 1945. It later opened regionally in such cities as Amarillo, Texas on April 6.

According to MGM records the film earned $1,892,000 in the US and Canada and $801,000 elsewhere resulting in a profit of $464,000.

Critical response
Kate Cameron of the New York Daily News awarded the film two-and-a-half stars out of four, though she felt it was ineffective at promoting the Women's Army Corps, noting that it "makes no attempt to show in what way the girls serve their country after leaving training camp, nor does it suggest how important they may become in the matter of relieving soldiers for active duty at the front." E. B. Radcliffe of The Cincinnati Enquirer noted that "the producer has done right by the corps in the standard of pulchritude he has chosen to represent it," but criticized its believability, noting that "two of the principal character are far-fetched and right out of [a] soap opera." The San Francisco Examiners Hortense Morton noted it as "a strictly feminine film," adding that, "while the story gets major treatment, the background of women in the Army, with its discipline, barracks life, and human elements, is shown with good purpose. The background is authentic." The Albany Times-Union reviewer described the film as "a kind of modern-day 'Three Musketeers'....As a documentary film of the WAC training at these two simulated posts, it is one of the most searching and informative pieces of publicity yet to reach the screen.

References

Sources

External links
 
  
 
 

1945 films
American war drama films
American black-and-white films
1940s war drama films
1940s English-language films
Films shot in Florida
Films shot in Iowa
Metro-Goldwyn-Mayer films
World War II films made in wartime
1945 drama films
Films directed by Edward Buzzell
Women's Army Corps